is a 1993 fighting video game developed by Tose and published by Bandai for the Super Nintendo Entertainment System. Based upon Akira Toriyama's Dragon Ball franchise, it is the sequel to Dragon Ball Z: Super Butōden, which was released earlier in 1993 for SNES. Following the Cell Games arc and a side-story about characters from the films Dragon Ball Z: Broly – The Legendary Super Saiyan and Dragon Ball Z: Bojack Unbound, its gameplay remains relatively the same as the original Super Butōden, consisting of one-on-one fights using a main six-button configuration, featuring special moves as well as three playable modes.

Dragon Ball Z: Super Butōden 2 was developed by most of the same team who previously worked on the first Super Butōden entry shortly after its completion. The team wanted to increase the number of playable stages, implement adventure elements to the tournament mode, as well as feature characters from the Dragon Ball Z films in the project. Super Butōden 2 garnered positive reception from critics; most reviewers praised the presentation, visuals, audio, gameplay and improvements made over its predecessor but others regarded it to be similar to Super Butōden and felt mixed in regards to various design aspects. It was followed by Dragon Ball Z: Super Butōden 3 in 1994.

Gameplay 

As with its predecessor, Dragon Ball Z: Super Butōden 2 is a fighting game similar to Street Fighter II: The World Warrior. Players fight against other characters in one-on-one matches and the fighter who manages to deplete the health bar of the opponent wins the bout and becomes the winner of the match. The game features three modes of play and a roster of 8 playable characters and their respective transformations, with five additional characters being unlockable via cheat code. Characters available are Goku, Vegeta, Gohan, Trunks, Piccolo, Cell, Cell Jr., Broly, Bojack and Zangya.

Super Butōden 2 uses a customizable six-button control scheme. Special moves are present in conventional format, with most commands consisting of button combinations. Characters can also dash back and forth by pressing L and R respectively. Players can also charge their Ki gauge by holding the Y and B buttons to unleash a Ki blast attack. Returning from the first game is the split-screen feature; the view is split to keep fighters that are far away in the playfield shown in a single screen, while their positions are kept via an improved on-screen radar. New to the sequel are the introduction of water-based arenas, the ability to counterattack special moves, as well as meteor combos to perform consecutive attacks.

Development and release 
Dragon Ball Z: Super Butōden 2 was created by most of the same team who previously worked on the original Super Butōden, with producer Toshihiro Suzuki and Shinsaku Shimada returning to helm its production and direction respectively. Members under the pseudonyms "JC Pyjama", "Maruko" and "Maruko Père" assisted as programmers. Both music and sound design were handled by Akihito "Switch•E" Suita, Kenji Yamamoto and Yuki "Kumatarou" Sabakuma. The French translation was written by Sylvie Bomstein and Takeshi Yasukawa. Other people also assisted with its development. According to Suzuki, development of the sequel began after completion of the original Super Butōden, with most of the staff reuniting again after a one-week vacation. The team decided to increase the number of stages while introducing adventure elements to the martial arts tournament mode, in addition to pushing characters from the Dragon Ball Z films into the game. The underwater stage was commissioned to Toei Animation.

Dragon Ball Z: Super Butōden 2 was first released by Bandai in Japan on December 17, 1993. The game was first slated to be released across Europe in April 1994 before being published in June 1994 by Bandai under the title Dragon Ball Z: La Légende Saien. On December 21, 1993, an album was published exclusively in Japan by Columbia, featuring arranged songs composed by Yamamoto. A translated English version for the Latin American market titled Dragon Ball was previewed in 1996 but never released. In 2015, the Japanese version of Super Butōden 2 was included as a pre-order bonus for Dragon Ball Z: Extreme Butōden on Nintendo 3DS for those who pre-ordered in the United Kingdom through retailer GAME or in the United States through online retailer Amazon using an email with a code to download the title, marking its first appearance in North American regions.

Reception 

In Japan, the game topped the Famitsu sales chart in December 1993. It proved to be a commercial success, with lifetime sales between 1.15 million and, according to Famitsu, 1.2 million units in Japan alone. Dragon Ball Z: Super Butōden 2 received positive reception from critics and players. Fan reception was positive: in a poll taken by Family Computer Magazine, the title received a score of 23.5 out of 30, indicating a large popular following. The 2016 mook, Perfect Guide of Nostalgic Super Famicom, listed it as the second best fighting game for the Super Famicom.

Grégoire Hellot and Olivier Prézeau of  praised the colorful anime-like visual presentation, character roster and controls but criticized the single-player mode for being repetitive and the lack of music from the Dragon Ball Z anime. Super Plays Dave Golder commended the graphics, gameplay and longevity but felt mixed in regards to the sound, while noting that the game was similar to Dragon Ball Z: Super Butōden. Likewise, Mega Funs Philip Noak also felt mixed about the audiovisual presentation and gameplay. Spanish magazine Nintendo Acción gave high remarks to the graphical and audio presentations, number of stages, speed and playability.

Bruno Sol of  praised the counterattack mechanic, stylized character designs, secrets and visuals, stating that "Dragon Ball Z 2 not only surpasses the previous 16-bit release from Nintendo, but we are also facing one of the most original, agile and fun beat'em up in recent years." Jeuxvideo.coms Rroyd-Y and Nintendo Lifes Gonçalo Lopes noted the overall improvements made over its predecessor.

Notes

References

External links 

 Dragon Ball Z: Super Butōden 2 at GameFAQs
 Dragon Ball Z: Super Butōden 2 at Giant Bomb
 Dragon Ball Z: Super Butōden 2 at MobyGames

1993 video games
Bandai games
Dragon Ball games
Fighting games
Multiplayer and single-player video games
Split-screen multiplayer games
Super Nintendo Entertainment System games
Super Nintendo Entertainment System-only games
Tose (company) games
Video game sequels
Video games developed in Japan
Video games scored by Kenji Yamamoto (composer, born 1958)